The Walter Patterson Filling Station is a historic automotive service station building on United States Route 65 in central Clinton, Arkansas.  It is a small single-story brick building, with a steeply pitched gable roof.  The front of the building is symmetrical, with a central entrance flanked by square single-pane display windows, and a cross-gable above the entrance.  Built in 1936, it is the only gas station from that period to survive in the city, and is a good example of commercial English Revival architecture.

The building was listed on the National Register of Historic Places in 2001.

See also
Walter Patterson House
National Register of Historic Places listings in Van Buren County, Arkansas

References

Gas stations on the National Register of Historic Places in Arkansas
Tudor Revival architecture in the United States
Commercial buildings completed in 1936
National Register of Historic Places in Van Buren County, Arkansas
Individually listed contributing properties to historic districts on the National Register in Arkansas
1936 establishments in Arkansas
Transportation in Van Buren County, Arkansas